Abbas Ahmad Hassan (born 10 May 1985) is a former professional footballer who played as a goalkeeper.

Born in Lebanon, Hassan moved to Sweden at a young age. Coming through the youth sector, Hassan made his professional debut at IF Elfsborg in 2005. After a loan at Aalborg BK in 2009–10, Hassan joined IFK Norrköping, with whom he stayed from 2011 to 2013. That year he returned to IF Elfsborg, playing three years, before moving to Örgryte IS in 2016. In 2017 Hassan moved for the first—and only—time away from Europe, playing in his country of origin, Lebanon. He played for Nejmeh between 2017 and 2020, when he retired.

Despite representing Sweden at youth level between 2003 and 2006, Hassan played 25 games for Lebanon at senior level between 2012 and 2018.

Club career
Starting his career in Arvidstorps IK, Hassan moved north in 2002 to Borås and IF Elfsborg. He had to wait until 2005 before making his debut for the club. When first choice goalkeeper Johan Wiland got injured, he played well enough to place Håkan Svensson, who had been brought in as a short-time replacement for the injured Wiland, on the bench. During the pre-season 2006 he became injured and Wiland reclaimed his place as first choice. In early 2008 Hassan was on trial with the English club Manchester City. Before the start of the 2009 season it was believed that he would replace Wiland who had left for Copenhagen, however the arrival of Australian goalkeeper Ante Čović and Swedish Joakim Wulff saw Hassan becoming third choice and he started to openly state that he wanted to leave the club.

On 9 July, it was confirmed that Hassan would leave IF Elfsborg and move to the Danish side Aalborg BK, signing a one-year loan contract. On 29 June (formally on 8 July), he joined the Swedish Superettan club IFK Norrköping on a short term contract to replace the injured goalkeeper David Nilsson.

On Friday 27 August, he made his debut in Superettan for IFK Norrköping against Ljungskile SK when he replaced goalkeeper Niklas Westberg who had received a one match suspension for his three yellow cards. The match ended 2–1 to IFK Norrköping. In December 2010 he signed a 3-year contract with IFK Norrköping after the club got promoted to Allsvenskan and formally left IF Elfsborg.

On 6 February 2013, Abbas returned to 2012 Swedish champions IF Elfsborg, after breaking his contract with IFK Norrköping. Replacing Andreas Andersson who left as a Bosman from Elfsborg to Ljungskile SK.

International career
Hassan has played his first game with the Lebanese national team against Iraq on 22 January 2012.

Abbas' star moment for Lebanon was the game against Iran, where he was man of the match, and helped his team to win, 1–0. Selected and promoted by German goalkeeper coach Christian Schweichler and coach Theo Bücker, he was in inspired form throughout the 90 minutes, produced a string of fine acrobatic saves in the closing stages as Iran threw everything forward, which forced Iran coach Carlos Queiroz to quote "I think a national hero was born today. For me the score was Abbas Hassan 1 Iran 0."

Later, his skills also helped the team during the match against South Korea, until Kim Chi-Woo equalized in 97'.

Honours
IF Elfsborg
 Allsvenskan: 2006
 Svenska Cupen: 2013–14
 Svenska Supercupen: 2007

Nejmeh
 Lebanese Elite Cup: 2017, 2018

Individual
 IFFHS All-time Lebanon Men's Dream Team

References

External links

 
 
 
 
 
 

1985 births
Living people
People from Marjeyoun District
Lebanese footballers
Swedish footballers
Lebanese emigrants to Sweden
Sportspeople of Lebanese descent
Naturalized citizens of Sweden
Association football goalkeepers
IF Elfsborg players
AaB Fodbold players
IFK Norrköping players
Örgryte IS players
Nejmeh SC players
Allsvenskan players
Superettan players
Lebanese Premier League players
Sweden youth international footballers
Sweden under-21 international footballers
Lebanon international footballers
Lebanese expatriate footballers
Swedish expatriate footballers
Lebanese expatriate sportspeople in Denmark
Swedish expatriate sportspeople in Denmark
Expatriate men's footballers in Denmark